Tredway is a surname, and may refer to:

 Brock Tredway (born 1959), Canadian ice hockey player
 Gilbert R. Tredway (born 1922), Indiana historian
 Lettice Mary Tredway (1595–1677), English abbess
 William Tredway (American politician) (1807–1891), American politician

See also
 Treadway (surname)